The Progressive Unionist Party (PUP) is a minor unionist political party in Northern Ireland. It was formed from the Independent Unionist Group operating in the Shankill area of Belfast, becoming the PUP in 1979. Linked to the Ulster Volunteer Force (UVF) and Red Hand Commando (RHC), for a time it described itself as "the only left of centre unionist party" in Northern Ireland, with its main support base in the loyalist working class communities of Belfast.

Since the Ulster Democratic Party's dissolution in 2001, the PUP has been the sole party in Northern Ireland representing paramilitary loyalism.

Party leaders

History
The party was founded by Hugh Smyth in the mid-1970s as the "Independent Unionist Group".  In 1977, two prominent members of the Northern Ireland Labour Party, David Overend and Jim McDonald, joined.  Overend subsequently wrote many of the group's policy documents, incorporating much of the NILP's platform. In 1979, the group was renamed the "Progressive Unionist Party".

In 1995, shortly after the Combined Loyalist Military Command announced a ceasefire, former UVF member Billy Hutchinson, who was jailed for the murder of two Catholics in 1974, defined the relationship between the PUP and the UVF: "The relationship is a very strict one in terms of acting as political confidants and providing political analysis for them, but it doesn't go any deeper than that."

The party has had a degree of electoral success.  In 1994 PUP leader Hugh Smyth became Lord Mayor of Belfast, and in the 1996 elections to the Northern Ireland Forum they secured two seats, with Smyth and David Ervine both being elected.  The PUP supported the Belfast Agreement and in the 1998 election to the Northern Ireland Assembly they also won two seats, with Hutchinson and David Ervine elected from the Belfast North and East constituencies respectively. Hutchinson lost his seat in the 2003 election, leaving Ervine as their sole Assembly representative. This was followed by a poor showing in the Northern Ireland local election of 2005, where Smyth and Ervine were their only two members to retain their seats on local authorities, and the party now seems to be in a state of decline.

Their position on the left of the political spectrum differentiates them from other unionist parties (such as the Ulster Unionist Party and the Democratic Unionist Party) which are ideologically right-wing.

Following a loyalist feud between the UVF and Loyalist Volunteer Force, in which four men were murdered by the UVF in Belfast and recognition of the UVF's ceasefire was withdrawn by the British government, the PUP debated ending its "special relationship" with the UVF. This was defeated in a closed vote at the party's annual conference in October 2005.

In March 2006, the Chairwoman of the PUP, Dawn Purvis, a research associate at the University of Ulster, was appointed as an independent member of the Northern Ireland Policing Board.

David Ervine died following a heart attack on 8 January 2007.  On 22 January 2007 Dawn Purvis was chosen as party leader. She is the second woman to lead a unionist party in Northern Ireland (after Anne Dickson's short-lived leadership of the Unionist Party of Northern Ireland following Brian Faulkner's retirement).  Dr John Kyle was co-opted on to Belfast City Council to fill Ervine's seat. The party did not field any candidates for the 2010 general elections - party members were encouraged to vote for a candidate of their choice.

Assembly elections, March 2007
The election was for 108 seats spread evenly across 18 constituencies.

The PUP fielded three candidates: Elaine Martin in North Down, Andrew Park in Belfast South and Dawn Purvis in Belfast East. Overall the party polled 3,822 votes or 0.6% of the votes cast in Northern Ireland, down 0.6% from the elections of 2003.

Dawn Purvis was elected to represent Belfast East, polling 3,045 votes (10.3%), finishing 5th out of the 15 candidates.

2010 resignations and relationship with UVF/RHC
In June 2010, Dawn Purvis resigned as leader, and as a member, of the party because of its relationship with the UVF and a recent murder attributed to that group. On 28 August 2010 the former deputy leader, David Rose, resigned from the party. He cited the recent murder attributed to the UVF and his belief that the party was "becoming increasingly conservative in outlook.

During a meeting in Belfast on 29 September 2010, members of the party agreed to maintain its relationship with the Ulster Volunteer Force and the Red Hand Commando. Despite these links, party leader Billy Hutchinson acknowledges that most UVF members vote for the larger Democratic Unionist Party.

Assembly elections, May 2011
The election was for 108 seats spread evenly across 18 constituencies. The party failed to regain the East Belfast seat and are unrepresented in the Assembly. Leader Brian Ervine resigned soon after the election and was replaced by veteran west Belfast activist Billy Hutchinson in October 2011.

Notable members
Former UVF member Billy Giles, who spent 14 years in the Maze Prison for a sectarian killing, was part of the PUP's negotiating team at the Good Friday Agreement in April 1998. Others involved in this process included Billy Mitchell, David Ervine, Jim McDonald, William 'Billy' Greer, Winston Churchill Rea and William "Plum" Smyth; all former UVF and Red Hand Commando members.

Electoral performance

UK general elections

1997 UK general election

2001 UK general election

Northern Ireland Assembly

See also
 Northern Ireland Assembly
 1998 Northern Ireland Assembly election
 2003 Northern Ireland Assembly election
 2007 Northern Ireland Assembly election
 2011 Northern Ireland Assembly election

References

External links
http://www.pupni.com/
PUP Manifesto - Assembly Elections 2003 - "How long are you prepared to wait?"

1979 establishments in Northern Ireland
Democratic socialist parties in Europe
Political parties established in 1979
Political parties in Northern Ireland
Socialist parties in Ireland
Socialist parties in the United Kingdom
Ulster unionist organisations
Ulster Volunteer Force